Metropolitan Alexander (secular name Aleksander Paulus, ; 15 February 1872 Uus-Vändra Parish (now Põhja-Pärnumaa Parish), Kreis Pernau – 18 October 1953 Stockholm) was an Estonian orthodox clergyman.

Paulus was the President of the Estonian Apostolic Orthodox Church. From 1920 until 1923, he was the Archbishop of Tallinn and Estonia. From 1923, he was Metropolitan of Tallinn and the whole of Estonia.

He was a member of IV Riigikogu, representing the Estonian People's Party.

References

1872 births
1953 deaths
People from Põhja-Pärnumaa Parish
People from Kreis Pernau
Bishops of the Estonian Apostolic Orthodox Church
Eastern Orthodox Christians from Estonia
Estonian People's Party politicians
National Centre Party (Estonia) politicians
Members of the Riigikogu, 1929–1932
Members of the Estonian National Assembly
Members of the Riiginõukogu
Estonian World War II refugees
Estonian emigrants to Sweden
Eastern Orthodox bishops in Europe